Protoparmelia is a genus of lichenized fungi in the family Parmeliaceae. The genus has a widespread distribution, and contains 11 species. Protoparmelia was circumscribed by French lichenologist Maurice Choisy in 1929.

Species
Protoparmelia atriseda (Fr.) R.Sant. & V.Wirth (1987)
Protoparmelia badia (Hoffm.) Hafellner (1984)
Protoparmelia ewersii Elix & P.M.McCarthy (2017) – Australia
Protoparmelia hierrensis van den Boom & Ertz (2012)
Protoparmelia megalosporoides Weerakoon & Aptroot (2013)
Protoparmelia memnonia Hafellner & Türk (2001)
Protoparmelia nebulosa Elix & Kantvilas (2009) – Australia
Protoparmelia nephaea (Sommerf.) R.Sant. (1990)
Protoparmelia ochrococca (Nyl.) P.M.Jørg., Rambold & Hertel 1988)
Protoparmelia oleagina (Harm.) Coppins (1992)
Protoparmelia olivascens (Nyl.) Llimona ex Sussey (2011)
Protoparmelia ryaniana van den Boom, Sipman & Elix (2007)

References

Parmeliaceae
Lichen genera
Lecanorales genera
Taxa named by Maurice Choisy
Taxa described in 1929